Manoj Mohammed (born 8 January 1999) is an Indian professional footballer who plays as a defender for Hyderabad in the Indian Super League.

Career
Manoj is a product of East Bengal F.C.' youth system. In 2010 Manoj joined the North Bengal academy of East Bengal at Rajganj, located at Jalpaiguri in North Bengal.

Ranjan Chowdhury, the Technical Director of East Bengal academy in Kolkata, transferred Manoj from the Rajganj academy to the main academy of East Bengal at Kolkata.

Manoj was the captain of the East Bengal U18 team and was a center back. He was a team member of East Bengal U18 squad that had narrowly lost in the final of the 2016–17 I-League U18.

In 2018 East Bengal head coach Alejandro Menéndez added him in the senior team squad for the 2018-19 I-League. Alejandro converted him from centre back to left back.

On 27 October 2018 he made his professional debut in an away match against NEROCA FC.

Career statistics

Club

Honours
Mohammedan Sporting
Calcutta Football League: 2021

References

1999 births
Living people
People from Jalpaiguri
Footballers from West Bengal
Indian footballers
Association football defenders
East Bengal Club players
I-League players
Mohammedan SC (Kolkata) players
Hyderabad FC players
Calcutta Football League players